An Imperative Duty is a short realist novel by William Dean Howells published in 1891. The novel explores the idea of "passing" through the racially mixed character of Rhoda Aldgate, a young woman whose aunt informs her that she is one-sixteenth African American. Rhoda lived her whole life "passing" as a white person.

List of Characters
Rhoda Aldgate, a woman of one-sixteenth black ancestry
Rev. Mr. Bloomingdale, Rhoda's first suitor, a white man
Dr. Olney, Mrs. Meredith's physician and Rhoda's eventual suitor, a white man
Mrs. Meredith, Rhoda's aunt, a white woman

Plot summary
The book is about Rhoda Aldgate, a young woman who discovers she is one-sixteenth African American, after living her whole life as a white person. Rhoda's father was Mrs. Meredith's brother, a white man, and Rhoda's mother was a southern woman of one-eighth black ancestry. In the nineteenth century, Rhoda's mother would have been referred to as an "octoroon."

Themes
The book is about a "Tragic Mulatta" character, a stereotype used by 19th-century American authors to explore racial miscegenation.

References

External links
 An Imperative Duty Full text HTML version scanned from 1893 edition published by Harper & Brothers. Scanned and proofread by D. Campbell. 
 An Imperative Duty 1893 edition, Harper and Bros. / Franklin Square, from Google Books

1891 American novels
Works by William Dean Howells
Novels set in Boston
Realist novels
Harper & Brothers books